Rastan may refer to:
 Al-Rastan, a city in Syria
 Al-Rastan District, a district in Syria
 Rastan (arcade game), a 1987 platform game